Noraphat Kaikaew  (Thai : นรภัทร ไก่แก้ว); born 19 June 1990), is a Thai professional footballer.

References

External links

1990 births
Living people
Noraphat Kaikaew
Noraphat Kaikaew
Noraphat Kaikaew
Noraphat Kaikaew
Noraphat Kaikaew
Noraphat Kaikaew
Noraphat Kaikaew
Noraphat Kaikaew
Association football forwards